Munsan Station is a railway station on the Gyeongui Line. It is notable for being the closest station on the Seoul Metropolitan Subway to the border with North Korea that is open for passenger service, only a few kilometers away.

Services
As a regular railway station it is an interim stop between Dorasan Station in the Demilitarised Zone and Seoul Station. The tourist train between Seoul and the DMZ Border is currently not in operation, due to concerns about the spread of the outbreak of African swine fever.

The Gyeongui–Jungang Line (Munsan–Imjingang) extension opened on March 28, 2020.

Station layout

References

External links
 Station information from Korail

Seoul Metropolitan Subway stations
Railway stations opened in 1906
Metro stations in Paju
1906 establishments in Korea